Ekaterina Arbore, Arbore-Ralli or Ralli-Arbore (rendered into Russian as Екатерина Арборе or Арборэ - Yekaterina Arborye or Arbore, with "Ralli" as Ралли; 1873 or 1875 – 2 December 1937), daughter of Zamfir Arbore (a socialist militant in Imperial Russia), was a Romanian, Soviet and Moldovan communist activist and official. She was born in Geneva.

Early life

She trained towards a medical degree, and became committed to socialism and the Social Democratic Party during her University years. As such, Ecaterina Arbore took part in the proceedings of the 2nd Congress of the Second International in 1903, and she served as member of the Executive Committee of the Socialist Party.

She campaigned for an efficient preventive medicine, especially as an answer to the rising incidence of tuberculosis within large groups of the industrial worker population (as stated in her 1907 medical sociology work, Influenţa industriilor asupra sănătăţii lucrătorilor). At the same time, she demanded increased social security, and tried herself to improve conditions, mainly by creating the very first crèches in Romania.

In the Soviet Union

After the October Revolution, she became an enthusiastic supporter of the Bolshevik cause, opting to leave Romania for Bolshevist Russia in 1918. Once there, after being received in the ranks of the Russian Communist Party, Ecaterina Arbore was integrated in the administrative structure of the Ukrainian SSR, as Commissar for Health.

She returned to Romania briefly, in 1924, being swiftly expelled by the authorities. Back in the Soviet state, Arbore was a delegate of the Romanian Socialist-Communist Party (Romanian Communist Party) to the 5th Congress of the Comintern, and took part in the Party's 5th Congress in Moscow and Kharkiv (1931). She became Health Commisar for the newly created Moldavian ASSR, being one of the Romanian/Moldovan intellectuals who endorsed the terms of the Soviet policy towards the Romanian state.

Persecution and murder

As a rather old member of the movement, she was a natural target for Joseph Stalin's repression. Viewed as a partisan of Trotskyism, she was marginalized and stripped of all political decision. This is the time when she was paid a visit by Romanian author Panait Istrati, during the latter's revelatory journey to the Soviet lands (as described in his The Confession of a Loser). Istrati praised the work carried by Arbore in the Health Department of the Republic, and likened her the legendary architect Meşterul Manole's wife, who according to myth, was walled in the monastery by her husband, who believed this to be the only thing able to prevent the building from collapsing; this is a reflection on the terror that was mounting in the Soviet Union, as a direct consequence of the state not being able to live up to its promise.

She was arrested during the Great Purge, and died in 1937 (it is not known whether this meant she was executed straight away, or whether her death was preceded by a stay in the Gulag). She was rehabilitated by Soviet authorities during the De-Stalinization process, and by Romanian ones a while after the rise of Nicolae Ceauşescu, during the condemnation of Soviet policies in 1968 (she was exonerated together with most Romanian communist victims of Stalin's purges).

References
 Henri H. Stahl, Gânditori şi curente de istorie socială românească, Cap. VII: "Curentul gândirii socialiste"
 Panait Istrati, The Confession of a Loser, "MASSR" chapter

1870s births
1937 deaths
Moldovan feminists
Romanian socialist feminists
Politicians of the Moldavian Autonomous Soviet Socialist Republic
Moldovan communists
Romanian Communist Party politicians
20th-century Romanian women politicians
Transnistrian women in politics
Romanian public health doctors
Romanian sociologists
Romanian women sociologists
Medical sociologists
Social Democratic Party of Romania (1910–1918) politicians
Romanian emigrants to the Soviet Union
Great Purge victims from Moldova
Executed Romanian women
Soviet rehabilitations
Ukrainian Soviet Socialist Republic people
Moldovan socialist feminists
Executed communists
Women public health doctors